Karan (also Romanized as Korān) is a village in Mizdej-e Sofla Rural District of Junqan District, Farsan County, Chaharmahal and Bakhtiari province, Iran. At the 2006 census, its population was 4,227 in 955 households. The following census in 2011 counted 4,345 people in 1,240 households. The latest census in 2016 showed a population of 4,049 people in 1,193 households; it was the only village remaining in its rural district and is populated by Lurs.

References 

Farsan County

Populated places in Chaharmahal and Bakhtiari Province

Populated places in Farsan County

Luri settlements in Chaharmahal and Bakhtiari Province